John Clark (born 14 October 1928) is an Australian cricketer. He played three first-class matches for New South Wales and Queensland between 1952/53 and 1953/54.

See also
 List of New South Wales representative cricketers

References

External links
 

1928 births
Living people
Australian cricketers
New South Wales cricketers
Queensland cricketers
Cricketers from Sydney